Harold Nicolaisen (18 May 1929 – 29 December 2009) was a Norwegian politician for the Conservative Party.

He served as a deputy representative to the Parliament of Norway from Nordland during the term 1965–1969. In total he met during 12 days of parliamentary session.

References

1929 births
2009 deaths
Deputy members of the Storting
Conservative Party (Norway) politicians
Nordland politicians